In enzymology, a plasmalogen synthase is an enzyme that catalyzes the chemical reaction

acyl-CoA + 1-O-alk-1-enyl-glycero-3-phosphocholine  CoA + plasmenylcholine

Thus, the two substrates of this enzyme are acyl-CoA and 1-O-alk-1-enyl-glycero-3-phosphocholine, whereas its two products are CoA and plasmenylcholine.

This enzyme belongs to the family of transferases, specifically those acyltransferases transferring groups other than aminoacyl groups.  The systematic name of this enzyme class is acyl-CoA:1-O-alk-1-enyl-glycero-3-phosphocholine 2-O-acyltransferase. Other names in common use include lysoplasmenylcholine acyltransferase, O-1-alkenylglycero-3-phosphorylcholine acyltransferase, and 1-alkenyl-glycero-3-phosphorylcholine:acyl-CoA acyltransferase.  This enzyme participates in ether lipid metabolism.

See also
 1-alkenylglycerophosphocholine O-acyltransferase

References

 

EC 2.3.1
Enzymes of unknown structure